Robert Jocelyn Walter Byrde (31 July 1922, Bournemouth – 8 May 2010, Wells, Somerset) was an English mycologist and phytopathologist. He was the president of the British Mycological Society for the academic year 1981–1982. He is known for his research, in collaboration with Anthony H. Fielding, on the role of pectolyic enzymes in physiological phytopathology. This research was a forerunner of many of the developments in molecular phytopathology.

Biography
Byrde grew up near Stroud, where he attended Wycliffe College, Gloucestershire. He matriculated in 1942 at the University of Reading, where he graduated in 1944 with a B.Sc. in horticulture. After graduation, he served in the Royal Electrical and Mechanical Engineers. He saw military action in support of heavy anti-aircraft artillery, attained the rank of captain, and served in India. In 1947 he returned to the University of Reading as a graduate student under the supervision of Raymond Henry Stoughton. Within one year Byrde moved to Long Ashton Research Station, which was part of the University of Bristol. At the research station, he completed his doctoral studies for his Ph.D. His research was published with the title Experiments on the control of Brown Rot of Apple and Plum. Much of his career was spent in the study of fungal causes of fruit rots and how orchard growers can cope with fruit rots. In 1950 he became a staff member of Long Ashton Research Station, where he spent almost the entirety of his career. Initially he worked with Ralph Warren Marsh, who was a valuable mentor for Byrde.

In the early part of his career, Byrde did important research on using fungicides to control fruit diseases, such as apple scab, powdery mildew, cankers caused by fungi, and brown rots caused by Monilinia fructicola. In 1965 he became the head of Long Ashton's phytopathology section, as the successor to R. W. Marsh. By 1975 Byrde was appointed to a readership at the University of Bristol. Towards the end of his career he visited India as a consultant in phytopathology.

In 2004 the British Society for Plant Pathology made him an Honorary Member.

Robert Byrde's wife Joyce died in 2002. Upon his death in 2010 he was survived by his daughter Rosemary.

Selected publications
 
 
 
 
 
 
 
 
 
 
 
  (2011 pbk reprint of 1987 1st edition)

Books
  (2012 pbk reprint of 1973 1st edition)
  (2013 reprint of 1977 1st edition)

References

1922 births
2010 deaths
British mycologists
British phytopathologists
Alumni of the University of Reading
Academics of the University of Bristol
Presidents of the British Mycological Society